Princess Maria Antonia of the Two Sicilies (19 December 1814 – 7 November 1898) was the Grand Duchess of Tuscany from 1833 to 1859 as the consort of Leopold II. In her signature, she used Maria Antonietta, the Italian form of her name.

Biography
Maria Antonia was born at the Royal Palace of Palermo on 19 December 1814, the daughter of Francis I of the Two Sicilies and his wife Maria Isabella of Spain. The girl was given the German baptismal name Maria Antonia in honor of her great-aunt Marie Antoinette, the deceased sister of her paternal grandmother, Maria Carolina of Austria.                                                                                               

When she was born, the Neapolitan court had already moved to Sicily because Napoleonic troops had invaded the continental part of the realm. After a few months, the royal family returned to Naples, thanks to the Congress of Vienna.

Maria Antonia was particularly close to her brother, the future Ferdinand II of the Two Sicilies, who affectionately dubbed her Totò.

Marriage and issue
In 1833, when she was eighteen, Maria Antonia married her first cousin Leopold II, Grand Duke of Tuscany, who was seventeen years older than her. Maria Antonia and Leopold had ten children, only six of whom lived to adulthood:

Archduchess Maria Isabella (21 May 1834 – 14 July 1901), who wed her maternal uncle Prince Francis, Count of Trapani, youngest son of Francis I of the Two Sicilies.
Ferdinand IV, Grand Duke of Tuscany (10 June 1835 – 17 January 1908).
Archduchess Maria Theresa (29 June 1836 – 5 August 1838), died in childhood. 
Archduchess Maria Christina (5 February 1838 – 1 September 1849), died in childhood. 
Archduke Karl Salvator (30 April 1839 – 18 January 1892)
Archduchess Maria Anna (9 June 1840 – 13 August 1841), died in childhood. 
Archduke Rainer (1 May 1842 – 14 August 1844), died in childhood. 
Archduchess Maria Luisa (31 October 1845 – 27 August 1917), who wed Karl, Prince of Isenburg-Büdingen.
Archduke Ludwig Salvator (4 August 1847 – 12 October 1915).
Archduke Johann Salvator (25 November 1852 – reported lost at sea in 1890, amidst speculation that he survived, subsequently using the alias "Johann Orth").

Tributes
The Piazza Maria Antonia – today Piazza dell'Indipendeza, the railway line Maria Antonia and the                                                  Maria Antonia train station, now called Firenze Santa Maria Novella, were named in her honour.

Revolution
On April 27, 1859, before the Franco-Austrian War, Leopold II proclaimed neutrality. On the afternoon of 27 April, Leopold II chose to leave Florence with his family in four carriages heading toward Bologna, rather than provoke any violence against what appeared to be a well orchestrated coup directed by the Piedmontese government. Shortly beforehand, Leopold II had refused to abdicate in favour of his son, Ferdinand IV, who then became the nominal Grand Duke of Tuscany after his father was forced to abdicate by the Austrian emperor Francis Joseph in July of the same year.

Later life
The grand ducal family then settled in Austria. In 1860, Leopold II bought the Bohemian chamber rule of Brandeis. After the political situation in Italy had calmed down to some extent, Leopold II and his wife traveled to Rome in November 1869, where he died in her arms on the night of January 29, 1870. After the death of her husband, Maria Antonia withdrew to Lake Traun and mostly stayed in Gmunden. Once a year, she went to the Eternal City, where she prayed at the place where her husband died and paid her respects to the Pope. As a widow, she by no means led a lonely life, and the sprightly lady went to visit her son Ludwig Salvator, who lived on Mallorca, when she was very old. The fact that her favorite son Johann Orth had been missing since 1890 shocked her and overshadowed her twilight years. 

Maria Antonia died on November 7, 1898 at the age of 83 at Ort Castle in Gmunden. She was buried in the Capuchin Crypt in Vienna.

Honours
  : Dame of the Order of the Starry Cross
  : Dame of the Sacred Military Constantinian Order of Saint George
  : Dame of the Order of Queen Maria Luisa
  : Dame Grand Cross of the Order of Saint Catherine

Ancestry

References

External links

|-

 

 

Princesses of Bourbon-Two Sicilies
Austrian princesses
Neapolitan princesses
Sicilian princesses
1814 births
1898 deaths
Nobility from Palermo
Grand Duchesses of Tuscany
Italian Roman Catholics
Burials at the Imperial Crypt
Daughters of kings